Péter Simek (born 30 January 1980 in Mór, Hungary) is a retired Hungarian football player. He generally played as an attacking midfielder right.

After debuting in 1997 at Videoton, he moved to Gázszer FC in 1999, where he stayed for two seasons. Vasas SC was next to buy him. With his new team, Simek managed to reach the UEFA Cup. His career peak was still ahead of him and it occurred at Újpest FC. While at the Budapest based club, Simek earned himself the first call-up at the Hungary national football team. However, he did not continue at Ujpest, despite three successful seasons there, and returned to his first club, now called Videoton Fehérvár. Although plagued by an injury before the 2005/2006 season, Simek managed to impress as soon as he returned on the pitch and attracted the attention of Poli Timișoara, who bought him for 480.000 dollars. After an unsuccessful season plagued with another serious knee injury he went back to Fehérvár. In February 2009 Újpest FC loaned him for half plus one year.

Simek has 9 caps for the Hungarian National football team.

External links

1980 births
Living people
People from Mór
Hungarian footballers
Association football midfielders
Hungary international footballers
Fehérvár FC players
Gázszer FC footballers
Vasas SC players
Újpest FC players
FC Politehnica Timișoara players
Liga I players
Hungarian expatriate footballers
Expatriate footballers in Romania
Hungarian expatriate sportspeople in Romania
Nemzeti Bajnokság I players
Rákospalotai EAC footballers
Sportspeople from Fejér County